Mario Sconcerti (24 October 1948 – 17 December 2022) was an Italian sports journalist and writer.

Biography
Sconcerti was the son of Adriano Sconcerti, a well-known boxing promoter and began his journalistic career at Corriere dello Sport in Florence. In 1972, he moved to the editorial office of Corriere dello Sport in Milan.

Death
On 17 December 2022, Sconcerti died in a hospital in Rome, one day before the 2022 FIFA World Cup Final and one day after the death of Sinisa Mihajlovic. He had been hospitalized for routine tests at the Roman polyclinic of Tor Vergata and death came suddenly. Until the day before his death he had collaborated with Corriere dello Sport.

References

1948 births
2022 deaths
Italian sports journalists
Italian newspaper editors
Italian male journalists
La Repubblica people
Italian magazine editors
Journalists from Florence